William I "the Elder" of Hesse-Rotenburg (15 May 1648, in Kassel – 20 November 1725, in Langenschwalbach) was from 1683 until his death Landgrave of Hesse-Rotenburg.  He was a son of Ernest I of Hesse-Rotenburg-Rheinfels and his wife, Countess Maria Eleonore of Solms-Lich.  William was nicknamed the Elder to distinguish him from his nephew, William of Hesse-Wanfried.

Life 
After his father's death in 1693, William ruled one half of the Rotenburg Quarter, the quarter of Hesse-Kassel which Landgrave Maurice of Hesse-Kassel had distributed as fiefs among the sons of his second wife, Juliane.  He officially resided in Rotenburg an der Fulda, but he often stayed in Langenschwalbach in the Taunus area.  His descendants ruled the Rotenburg Quarter; his grandson, Constantine reunited all the parts of the Quarter.

William's dominions included the lower part of the County of Katzenelnbogen and the districts and castles of Burg Rheinfels, Reichenberg and Hohenstein as well as shares of Umstadt and Vierherren an der Lahn.  He swapped the district and city of Eschwege with his brother Charles for the district and city of Rotenburg.  He also held the dominions of Falkenberg, Cornberg and Langenschwalbach and he received a share of the Hessian toll on the Rhine and custom duties on wine, agriculture and wool and the toll at Boppard.

William died in 1725 and was buried in the Catholic Church of St. Elizabeth in Langenschwalbach.

Marriage and issue 
William married on 3 March 1669 in Rochefort Countess Maria Anna of Löwenstein-Wertheim-Rochefort (1652–1688), sister of Maximilian Karl, Prince of Löwenstein-Wertheim-Rochefort. Anna died in 1688 and was buried in the Franciscan monastery in Boppard. With her, he had eight children, including his successor, Ernest II Leopold:
 Eleonore (born: November 26, 1674)
 Maria Eleonore (born: 25 September 1675) married Eustace Theodore, Count Palatine of Sulzbach
 Elisabeth Catherine Felicitas (born: 14 February 1677) married firstly Francis Alexander, Prince of Nassau-Hadamar; married secondly Count Anton Ferdinand of Attems
 Sophie (born: 4 April 1678)
 Maria Amelie Wilhelmine (born: August 6, 1679)
 Johanna (born: 12 September 1680), abbess
 Ernestine (born: 23 October 1681) married Roberto, Conde de la Cerda de Villalonga
 Ernest II Leopold (born: 25 June 1684), Landgrave of Hesse-Rotenburg married Eleonore Maria Anna, Countess of Löwenstein-Wertheim-Rochefort

House of Hesse
1648 births
1725 deaths
Landgraves of Hesse-Rotenburg